Thin Air is the 22nd Spenser novel by Robert B. Parker. The story follows Boston-based PI 
Spenser as he searches for the wife of his longtime associate, Sgt. Frank Belson of the Boston Police Department.

Plot
Belson returns home one night to find his young wife, Lisa, missing, with no clue as to her whereabouts.  He suspected that she may have left him, but circumstances seem to indicate she was kidnapped.  Shortly after confiding in Spenser, Belson is shot returning home one night.  Since he is unable to search for her himself as he is hospitalized, Spenser undertakes the search himself.

The investigation leads him to the impoverished town of Proctor where he has to uncover details of Lisa's life previous to meeting Belson to discover where she might be now.

Writing style
This novel is a bit different from most other Spenser novels as it tells the story concurrently not only from Spenser's point of view, but also from Lisa St. Claire's.  Parker had done this once before in Crimson Joy, where we also get the point of view of the serial killer that Spenser is tracking.

Recurring characters
Spenser
Chollo
Susan Silverman, Ph.D
Sgt. Frank Belson, Boston Police Department

In other media

The novel was made into a 2000 TV movie, starring Joe Mantegna as Spenser.

Cast
 Joe Mantegna as Spenser
 Marcia Gay Harden as Susan
 Joanna Miles as Evans
 Jon Seda as Luis DeLeon
 David Ferry as Frank Belson

External links
The page on the book from the author's website
 

1995 American novels
Spenser (novel series)
Novels set in Boston
American novels adapted into films
American novels adapted into television shows